An earthquake measuring 8.0  struck Santiago, Chile, on 3 March 1985, killing 177 people and injuring about 2,575 others. This earthquake was being felt between the northern Antofagasta Region and the southern Los Lagos Region. It was felt with a maximum intensity of VIII on the Mercalli intensity scale.

Damage and effects 

The quake left 177 people dead, 2,575 injured, 85,358 houses damaged or destroyed and about a million people homeless. Many landslides were registered too, pavement breaks with the destruction of the Pan-American Highway in several points, broken-down bridges and considerable damage in affected town's infrastructure, with a long interruption on basic services. The damage was valued in more than 1 billion US dollars.

Reports by local residents in the coastal area from Matanzas to several kilometers north of Algarrobo indicated unusually low tides for a period of 3 to 5 days following the earthquake. After this, the tides reportedly returned to normal. This suggests that there was earthquake-related uplift along parts of the coast which was recovered in 3 to 5 days after the earthquake. Near Algarrobo, an estimate of the change is about 20 cm uplift.

Tectonic setting 
Chile lies on the boundary between the Nazca Plate of the South Pacific continental plate. This results in Chile being one of the most seismically active regions in the world. On average, a magnitude 8 earthquake or greater occurs in the region about once every 25 years. Meaning that there is an expectation that a similar earthquake will happen in Chile in the future every 25 years. The main shock was actually made up of at least two shocks, with the initial motion beginning at approximately 11:00 PM followed by a greater event soon after. The magnitudes of the first and second shocks were calculated to be 5.2 and 6.9 respectively. The calculated proportion of energy released as aftershocks vs the main shock was relatively high, most likely due to the 7.2 aftershock on 9 April.

Scientific understanding 
The earthquake was seen as particularly powerful, garnering the attention of the United States. They sent a team of geologists to study its effects because the overall information that could be gained from studying the earthquake could give better understandings overall of these powerful earthquakes. This earthquake in particular was considered extremely important in the understanding of earthquakes as "it was very significant as a geophysical event and that the scientific and engineering study of this major shock would be of great value in improving our understanding of plate margin earthquakes, the distribution of strong ground motion, resulting building damage and geologic effects such as soil liquefaction and landsliding". The 1985 Algarrobo earthquake shows a clear example of how these types of natural phenomenon can be studied and be used to better help humanity in the future in order to minimize the damages to both infrastructure and human lives. The precautions that Chile takes now in order to mitigate future risks is to educate its citizens in drills on how to react, having better building codes, and studying seismic data.

See also
List of earthquakes in 1985
1960 Valdivia earthquake
List of earthquakes in Chile

References

Further reading

External links

1985 Algarrobo earthquake
1985 in Chile
1985 earthquakes
March 1985 events in South America